FF Jaro is a Finnish football club, based in the bilingual town of Jakobstad. It currently plays in Ykkönen. Home matches are played at the Jakobstads Centralplan.

Current squad
Updated 7 March, 2022.

Management and boardroom

Management
As of 22 July 2021

Boardroom
As of 22 July 2021

Season to season

23 seasons in Veikkausliiga
22 seasons in Ykkönen
9 seasons in Kakkonen

International achievements

1996 UEFA Intertoto Cup
FF Jaro –  Guingamp 0-0 
 Dinamo Bucharest – FF Jaro 0-2 
FF Jaro –  Kolkheti Poti 2-0 
 Zemun – FF Jaro 3-2

Former managers

 Börje Nygård (1966–67)
 Rainer Aho (1968–70)
 Matti Aarni (1971–74)
 Bjarne Sjöholm (1975–77)
 Esko Vikman (1978)
 Ulf Larsson (1979)
 Bjarne Sjöholm (1980)
 Jan–Eric Holmberg (1981)
 Kalle Jaskari (1982–84)
 Matti Huotari (1985)
 Kalle Jaskari (1986)
 Richard Wilson (1987–89)
 Kari Mars (1989)
 Hannu Touru (1990–93)
 Antti Muurinen (1994–96)
 Veijo Wahlsten (1997)
 Keijo Paananen (1997)
 Janne Westerlund (1998)
 Keijo Paananen (1999–01)
 Sixten Boström (2002–04)
 Hannu Touru (2004–05), (2006)
 Mika Laurikainen (2007–09)
  Alexei Eremenko Sr. (Aug 19, 2009–Jun 10, 2016)
 Kristian Heames (Jul 28, 2016–Jul 10, 2017)
 Calle Löf (Jul 11, 2017-Oct, 2017)
 Tomi Kärkkäinen (Jan 1, 2018-Aug 13, 2018)
 Niklas Käcko (Aug 14, 2018-Dec 31, 2020)
 Jimmy Wargh (Jan 1, 2021–Oct, 2022)

References

External links
Official website 
Fansite 

 
Jaro
Jaro
Jakobstad
1965 establishments in Finland